Varzaneh is the capital city of varzaneh District, in Isfahan County, Isfahan Province, Iran. At the 2006 census, its population was 11,506, in 2,981 families.

Gallery

References

External links

Populated places in Isfahan County

Cities in Isfahan Province